Monique Queis-Tijsterman (born 10 March 1969) is a Dutch handball coach and former player. Since September 2021, she served as head coach of the Dutch women's national team. She is considered to be one of the most important figures in Dutch handball history.

Tijsterman coached the Dutch national team at the 2021 World Women's Handball Championship, replacing Emmanuel Mayonnade.

References

External links

1969 births
Living people
Dutch female handball players
Dutch handball coaches
Sportspeople from Amsterdam
Handball coaches of international teams
21st-century Dutch women